The Myrtle Beach metropolitan area (also Myrtle Beach–Conway–North Myrtle Beach MSA) is a census-designated metropolitan statistical area consisting of Horry County in South Carolina and Brunswick County in North Carolina. The wider Myrtle Beach CSA includes Georgetown County, South Carolina . The region's primary cities, in order by population are Myrtle Beach, South Carolina; Conway, South Carolina; Leland, North Carolina; North Myrtle Beach, South Carolina and Georgetown, South Carolina. Also included is Oak Island, North Carolina with a permanent population of 6,783 (as of the 2010 census) but a summertime population of approximately 50,000.

Area

Largest cities and towns

Demographics

The estimated population of the area was 465,391 in 2013.

References

 
Metropolitan areas of South Carolina